The U.S. Military M274 Truck, Platform, Utility,  Ton, 4X4 or "Carrier, Light Weapons, Infantry,  ton, 4x4", also known as the "Mule", "Military Mule", or "Mechanical Mule", is a 4-wheel drive, gasoline-powered truck/tractor type vehicle that can carry up to  off-road. It was introduced in 1956 and used until the 1980s.

Background 
The M274 Mule was introduced in 1956 to supplement both the  trucks ("Jeeps") and  trucks (Weapons Carrier Series and M37 series) in airborne and infantry battalions. The M274 evolved from improvements to a vehicle designed at the end of World War Two by Willys-Overland as a medical evacuation litter carrier from areas and terrain that would be a problem for the standard light vehicle of the period (the Jeep) to access.  U.S. Patent 2457400 for the original design was applied for on December 2, 1944 and issued on December 28, 1948. No patent appears to have been issued for the later production model. Further tests by the US Army at Eglin Field, Florida proved it also useful as carrier for both supplies and men. In 1948 the US Army purchased a small number of these test vehicles with the designation the 'Jungle Burden Carrier' for evaluation in jungle warfare and with airborne forces.

There were 11,240 Mules produced between their introduction and 1970, when production ceased.  They were used throughout as platforms for various weapons systems and for carrying men, supplies, and weaponry/ammunition during the Vietnam War and in other U.S. military operations until the 1980s. As a completely open and exposed vehicle, they offered absolutely no protection to the driver, yet that was relatively unimportant as they were mainly used as cargo carriers and medium-range infantry support vehicles, rather than tactical vehicles.

The driver's seat could be removed and the steering column moved forward and the vehicle driven in reverse to accommodate more cargo. If under fire the steering column could be moved further forward and down, so the operator could operate the vehicle while crawling behind it. They were phased out from military usage in the 1980s with the introduction of the HMMWV series vehicles. The HMMWV was, however, unable to fulfill the role of the Mule, so the M-Gator, a military variant of the popular John Deere Gator vehicle, was introduced.

Armament 
The M274 Mules were often outfitted with a wide array of weaponry, especially in the Vietnam War. They could be modified to carry virtually any type of conventional weapon that could be mounted on a truck.  Most commonly, the M274 was outfitted with:

 M60 7.62mm NATO light machine guns
 M2HB .50 Caliber machine guns
 M 40 106 mm recoilless rifles
 TOW anti-tank missile systems

Powerplant, drivetrain, and speeds 
The M274 Mules were all powered by internal-combustion gasoline engines.
The variants of the M274 with respective powerplants were:
M274 – four-cylinder Willys four-cycle 
M274 A1 – four-cylinder Willys four-cycle 
M274 A2 to A5 – two-cylinder Continental-Hercules two-cycle, air-cooled
All Mules had three-speed manual, non-synchromesh transmissions with two-speed transfer cases, and were four-wheel drive vehicles.
All Mules except the A5 variants had four-wheel steering.
Only the A5 variants had electric ignition as standard.
They had no suspension aside from the low-pressure tires and the seat cushions.

The lower speeds and high power of the Mule made it a versatile off-road vehicle. It could climb over logs, go up steep slopes, and cross rivers in first gear.

Low range
First – 
Second – 
Third – 

High range
First – 
Second – 
Third –

See also
 G-numbers

References

External links

 US Army Transportation Museum page on the M274 Mule 
 Olive-Drab website on the M274
 Bill Watson's M274 Mule website
  "Jungle Buggy Packs A Load" , May 1948, Popular Science vehicle from which M27 evolved
 Vehicle lunarization study, US Army M-274 'Mule' vehicle. Volume 2, part 1: Technical discussion
 Vehicle lunarization study, US Army M-274 'Mule' vehicle. Volume 2, part 2: Appendix
 M274A2 at U.S. Veterans Memorial Museum

Military trucks of the United States
Off-road vehicles
Military vehicles introduced in the 1950s